Blaenavon Hospital was a small community hospital located in Blaenavon, Wales. It was managed by the Aneurin Bevan University Health Board.

History
In 1924, Ty Mawr, a house on the eastern side of Church Road, originally built for Sam Hopkins, ironmaster of Blaenavon Ironworks, was converted into a hospital.

A new purpose-built hospital was built on the western side of Church Road in 1985 and Ty Mawr became a nursing home known as The Beaches. The beds in the new hospital were closed to in-patients in October 2010 and, after primary care services were transferred to the new Blaenavon Resource Centre on Middle Coed Cae Road, it closed completely in autumn 2014.

References

Defunct hospitals in Wales
Hospitals in Torfaen
Hospital buildings completed in 1985
Hospitals established in 1924